Spanish Eyes is a 1930 British musical film directed by G. B. Samuelson and starring Anthony Ireland, Donald Calthrop and Dennis Noble. It had a gypsy theme and was made at Twickenham Studios in West London. The film was made at night, to allow other more important productions to use the studio in the daytime - a common practice at Twickenham during the era.

The film became known for the death of Nita Foy, a West End chorus girl who was working on the film, in what became known as "the Film Studio Horror". Foy was invited to Donald Calthrop's dressing room for a drink where her costume caught fire. Although the inquest exonerated him Calthrop's career never entirely recovered from the incident.

Cast
 Anthony Ireland - Chechester 
 Dennis Noble - Amalio
 Donald Calthrop - Mascoso 
 Edna Davies - Estrella 
 Antonia Brough - Landlady

Bibliography
 Sweet, Matthew. Shepperton Babylon: The Lost Worlds of British Cinema. Faber and Faber, 2005.

References

External links

1930 films
British musical films
Films directed by G. B. Samuelson
British black-and-white films
1930 musical films
1930s English-language films
1930s British films